Valence-en-Brie (literally Valence in Brie) is a commune in the Seine-et-Marne department in the Île-de-France region in north-central France.

Demographics
Inhabitants of Valence-en-Brie are called Valençois.

See also
Communes of the Seine-et-Marne department

References

Communes of Seine-et-Marne